Grand Marais Light is located on the outer end of a breakwater on the shore of Lake Superior in the city of Grand Marais in Cook County, Minnesota, United States. It is located in USCG District 9.

The tower was first lit in 1922 and is still operational.

The original keeper's house on shore is now operated as the main museum of the Cook County Historical Society.  The museum features exhibits on area history, industry and culture.

See also
Grand Marais, Minnesota
List of lighthouses in the United States

References

External links
 Cook County Historical Society

Buildings and structures in Cook County, Minnesota
Lighthouses completed in 1922
Lighthouses in Minnesota
Museums in Cook County, Minnesota
Transportation in Cook County, Minnesota
Grand Marais, Minnesota